Sisters of Providence may refer to a number of congregations of Religious Sisters:

 Sisters of Providence (Montreal), founded in 1840 by Émilie Gamelin
 Sisters of Providence (Ruillé-sur-Loir, France), founded in 1806
 Sisters of Providence of Holyoke, founded in 1873 in Massachusetts as the first mission of the Sisters of Providence of St. Vincent de Paul
 Sisters of Providence of Saint Mary-of-the-Woods, founded in 1840 in Indiana by St. Mother Théodore Guérin
 Sisters of Providence of St. Vincent de Paul, founded in 1861, Kingston, Ontario, Canada
 Sisters of Providence of the Institute of Charity, founded in 1832 by Antonio Rosmini
 Sisters of Providence of Lisieux, founded in 1691 as a separate branch of the Sisters in Rouen by King Louis XIV
 Sisters of Providence of Rouen, later the Sisters of the Infant Jesus, founded in 1666 by Nicholas Barré
 Congregation of Divine Providence, Mainz, founded in 1851 in Germany by Wilhelm Emmanuel von Ketteler
 Congregation of Divine Providence, Saint-Jean-de-Bassel, Lorraine, founded in 1762 by Jean-Martin Moye
 Daughters of Providence (Paris), 1651–1681
 Daughters of Providence, founded in 1816 in Brittany by Jean-Marie de Lamennais
 Oblate Sisters of Providence, founded in 1829, Baltimore, Maryland, first religious congregation composed of women of African descent
 Women of Providence in Collaboration, an association of congregations of Roman Catholic sisters